The following lists events that happened during 2004 in New Zealand.

Population
 Estimated population as of 31 December: 4,114,300
 Increase since 31 December 2003: 52,800 (1.30%)
 Males per 100 Females: 96.1

Incumbents

Regal and viceregal
Head of State – Elizabeth II
Governor-General – Dame Silvia Cartwright

Government
The 47th New Zealand Parliament continued. Government was a coalition between
Labour and the small Progressive party with
United Future supporting confidence and supply votes.

Speaker of the House – Jonathan Hunt (Labour)
Prime Minister – Helen Clark (Labour)
Deputy Prime Minister – Michael Cullen (Labour)
Minister of Finance – Michael Cullen (Labour)
Minister of Foreign Affairs – Phil Goff (Labour)

Opposition leaders
National – Don Brash (Leader of the Opposition)
Greens – Jeanette Fitzsimons and Rod Donald
Act – Richard Prebble to Rodney Hide
New Zealand First – Winston Peters
United Future – Peter Dunne
Māori Party – Tariana Turia

Judiciary
Chief Justice — Sian Elias

Main centre leaders
Mayor of Auckland – John Banks to Dick Hubbard
Mayor of Tauranga – Stuart Crosby
Mayor of Hamilton – David Braithwaite to Michael Redman
Mayor of Wellington – Kerry Prendergast
Mayor of Christchurch – Garry Moore
Mayor of Dunedin – Sukhi Turner to Peter Chin

Other
State Services Commissioner – Mark Prebble

Events

January 
 27 January: National Party leader Don Brash delivers a speech at Orewa highly critical of the government's policy towards Māori.

February

March

April 
 8 April: New Zealand First party announces it would give its support to the government's foreshore legislation.
 30 April: Tariana Turia announces she will vote against the Government's foreshore and seabed legislation.

May 
 5 May: A hikoi against the foreshore and seabed legislation arrives in Wellington.
 7 May: The government's foreshore and seabed Bill passes its first vote in Parliament.
 11 May: The Criminal Records (Clean Slate) Act is passed. The Act allows people who have not reoffended for seven years to not declare minor criminal convictions in most circumstances.

June 
 30 June: Statistics New Zealand estimates for this date put the Cities of Lower Hutt and Tauranga at over 100,000 residents for the first time and Waimakariri District at over 40,000

July 
 1 July: First sitting of the new Supreme Court.
 10 July: Te Tai Hauauru by-election won by Tariana Turia for the new Māori Party.
 15 July: 2004 Israel–New Zealand passport scandal: New Zealand imposes diplomatic sanctions against Israel after two Israeli citizens are convicted of passport fraud.

August 
 2 August: Around 7,500 Destiny Church members march on Parliament in black shirts to protest liberal social policies.
 15 August: Tornado in Waitara. Two fatalities when a farmhouse is destroyed. 
 19 August: Cereal maker Dick Hubbard announces he is running for the position of Mayor of Auckland.

September

October 
 6 October: Waikato Hospital doctors complete a 22-hour surgery to separate a pair of conjoined twins.
 9 October: 2004 local body and health board elections completed, but not all of the counting; and some results need to wait for special votes. All three West Coast mayors unseated, along with several in more populous centres such as Auckland.
 11 October: Disappearance under controversial circumstances of Iraena Asher at Piha, a West Auckland beach.

November 
 1 November: A reciprocal working holiday agreement between New Zealand and Belgium comes into effect.
 18 November: Legislation passed vesting ownership of all land up to the high tide mark in New Zealand with the Crown.
 29 November: The Criminal Records (Clean Slate) Act comes into force.

December 
 9 December: The Supreme Court of New Zealand granted Ahmed Zaoui bail. He will reside in the Dominican Friary in Auckland.  He will have to report to the police twice a week and must spend each night in the friary.
 9 December: The Civil Unions Act is passed. The Act establishes the new institution of civil union, available to same-sex and de facto couples.
 10 December: Smoking is banned in workplaces or licensed premises.
 26 December: 5 New Zealanders are among the victims of the 2004 Indian Ocean earthquake and tsunami.

Undated 
 National Communications Corporation Limited is founded.

Arts and literature

Awards 
Katherine Duignan wins the Robert Burns Fellowship.

Montana Book Awards 2004 
Deutz Medal for Fiction – Slow Water by Annamarie Jagose
Montana Medal for Non-fiction – The Trial of the Cannibal Dog by Anne Salmond
Readers' Choice – Penguin History of New Zealand by Michael King
Poetry – Sing-song by Anne Kennedy
History – The Trial of the Cannibal Dog by Anne Salmond
Lifestyle and contemporary culture – Classic fly fishing in New Zealand Rivers by David Hallett and John Kent
Biography – Mason by Rachael Barrowman
Illustrative – Central by Arno Gasteiger
Reference & Anthology – Whetu Moana: Contemporary Polynesian Poetry in English
Environment – Deep New Zealand: Blue Water, Black Abyss by Peter Batson
A.W. Reed Award for Contribution to New Zealand Literature – Joy Cowley

Music

New Zealand Music Awards 
New categories introduced were 'Best Rock Album', 'People's Choice Award' and 'Airplay Record of the Year'. 'New Zealand Radio Programmer of the Year' was retired.

Album of the Year: Scribe (rapper) – The Crusader
Single of the Year: Scribe – Stand Up
Best Group: Dimmer – You've Got To Hear The Music
Breakthrough Artist of the Year: Brooke Fraser – What To Do With Daylight
Best Male Solo Artist: Scribe – The Crusader
Best Female Solo Artist: Brooke Fraser – What To Do With Daylight
Highest Selling Nz Album: Hayley Westenra – Pure
Highest Selling Nz Single: Ben Lummis – They Can't Take That Away
Songwriter of the Year: Scribe, P-Money, Con Psy & Savage (rapper)  – Not Many : The Remix!
Best Music Video: Chris Graham – Stand Up (Scribe)
Best Rock Album (new category): Dimmer – You've Got To Hear The Music
Best Urban/Hip Hop Album: Scribe – The Crusader
Best Dance/Electronica Album: Salmonella Dub – One Drop East
Best Maori Album: Ruia – Hawaiki
Best Pacific Music Album: Te Vaka – Tutuki
Best Jazz Album: The Rodger Fox Big Band – A Rare Connection
Best Classical Album: John Psathas – Psathas : Fragments
Best Gospel / Christian Album: Magnify – In Wonder
International Achievement: Hayley Westenra
People's Choice Award (new category): Scribe
Best Producer: P-Money – The Crusader (Scribe)
Best Engineer: Chris Van De Geer – Passenger – (Carly Binding)
Best Album Cover: Ben Sciascia – Postage (Supergroove)
Airplay Record of the Year (new category): Goldenhorse – Maybe Tomorrow
Best Country Music Album: Donna Dean – Money
Best Country Music Song: Donna Dean – Work It Out
Best Folk Album: Brendyn Montgomery And Mike Considine – Mountain Air
Lifetime Achievement Award: Shaun Joyce

Performing arts 

 Benny Award presented by the Variety Artists Club of New Zealand to Eldred Stebbing MNZM.

Television 
 28 March: Māori Television commences.
 22 September: Animated series bro'Town premieres on TV3.
 The Insider's Guide To Happiness

Film 
 29 February: The Lord of the Rings: The Return of the King wins all 11 Academy Awards for which it was nominated.
Fracture
In My Father's Den
Kaikohe Demolition

Internet 
See: NZ Internet History

Sport

Athletics 
Dale Warrender wins his first national title in the men's marathon, clocking 2:23:40 on 1 May in Rotorua, while Nyla Carroll claims her second in the women's championship (2:46:44).

Basketball 
 The National Basketball League was won by the Auckland Stars who beat the Nelson Giants 80–68 in the final.
 The Women's National Basketball League was won by the Canterbury Wildcats who beat the Nelson Sparks 68–58 in the final.

Cricket 
 The State Championship for 2003–04 was won by the Wellington Firebirds.
 In December Australia and New Zealand played a series of 3 one-day matches in Australia for the inaugural Chappell–Hadlee Trophy. After winning one game each, the decider was washed out by rain, so the trophy was shared.

Horse racing

Harness racing 
 New Zealand Trotting Cup: Just An Excuse – 2nd win
 Auckland Trotting Cup: Elsu – 2nd win

Olympic Games 

 New Zealand sends a team of 148 competitors in 18 sports.

Paralympics 

 New Zealand sends a team of 35 competitors across nine sports.

Rugby league 
 Bartercard Cup won by the Mt Albert Lions

Rugby union 
  June – July: 2004 Philips International Series: The All Blacks beat England 36–3, England 36–12, Argentina 41-7 and Pacific Islanders rugby union team 41–26.
 17 July: The All Blacks beat Australia 16–7 at Westpac Stadium as part of the 2004 Tri Nations Series
 24 July: The All Blacks beat South Africa 23–21 at Jade Stadium as part of the 2004 Tri Nations Series
 7 August: The All Blacks lose 18–23 to Australia at Telstra Stadium as part of the 2004 Tri Nations Series
 14 August: The All Blacks lose 26–40 to South Africa at Ellis Park Stadium as part of the 2004 Tri Nations Series
 15 August: Bay of Plenty beat Auckland 33-28 to take the Ranfurly Shield
 5 September: Canterbury beat Bay of Plenty 33-26 to take the Ranfurly Shield
 13 November: The All Blacks beat Italy 59–10 at Stadio Flaminio as part of the 2004 All Black Tour of Europe
 20 November: The All Blacks beat Wales 26–25 at Millennium Stadium as part of the 2004 All Black Tour of Europe
 27 November: The All Blacks beat France 45–6 at Stade de France as part of the 2004 All Black Tour of Europe
 4 December: The All Blacks beat The Barbarians 47–9 at Twickenham as part of the 2004 All Black Tour of Europe

Shooting 
Ballinger Belt – 
 Edd Newman (United States)
 John Whiteman (Upper Hutt), second, top New Zealander

Soccer 
 The Chatham Cup is won by Miramar Rangers who beat Waitakere City F.C. 1–0 in the final after extra time.

Births
 1 January – Sylvia Brunt, rugby union player
 8 April – Fran Jonas, cricketer
 8 May – Izzy Gaze, cricketer
 10 May – Jenna Hastings, mountain biker
 12 July – Laura Littlejohn, swimmer
 14 August – Jay Herdman, association footballer
 8 October – C'est La Guerre, Thoroughbred racehorse
 3 November – Auckland Reactor, Standardbred racehorse
 1 December – Joshua Willmer, swimmer
 Undated – Allen Chi Zhou Fan, chess player

Deaths

January 
 11 January – Sir Peter Elworthy, farmer, farming leader, businessman (born 1935)
 19 January – Murray Watkinson, rower (born 1939)
 21 January – Jock Newall, association football player (born 1917)
 25 January – Sonny Schmidt, bodybuilder (born 1953)
 29 January – Janet Frame, writer (born 1924)

February 
 11 February – June Westbury, politician (born 1921)
 14 February – Jock Butterfield, rugby league player (born 1932)
 16 February – Don Cleverley, cricketer (born 1909)
 17 February – Sir Peter Quilliam, jurist (born 1920)
 21 February – Norval Morris, lawyer, criminologist, novelist (born 1923)
 26 February – Roger Mirams, filmmaker (born 1918)
 29 February – Graham Gordon, doctor (born 1927)

March 
 1 March – John Lithgow, politician (born 1933)
 3 March – Susan Moller Okin, feminist political philosopher (born 1946)
 4 March – Arthur Kinsella, politician (born 1918)
 5 March – Martin Emond, cartoon illustrator and painter (born 1969)
 8 March – Frank Mooney, cricketer (born 1921)
 17 March – Sir William Pickering, rocket scientist (born 1910)
 19 March – Chris Timms, sailor (born 1947)
 30 March – Michael King, historian and biographer (born 1945)

April 
 6 April – Joan Monahan (née Hastings), swimmer, botanist and schoolteacher (born 1925)
 16 April – John Caselberg, writer and poet (born 1927)

May 
 3 May – Rahera Windsor, founding member and kuia of Ngāti Rānana (born 1925)
 15 May – Hector Wilson, rugby union player (born 1924)
 17 May – Ken Mudford, motorcycle racer (born 1923)
 19 May
 Rowan Barbour, cricketer (born 1922)
 Tim Hewat, television producer and journalist (born 1928)
 21 May – Frank McMullen, rugby union player and referee (born 1933)
 22 May – Wayne Kimber, politician (born 1949)

June 
 5 June – Jack Foster, athlete (born 1932)
 24 June
 Pat Kelly, trade union leader (born 1929)
 Ron Sharp, farmer, inventor of the herringbone milking shed (born 1919)
 25 June – Morton Coutts, inventor, brewer (born 1904)

July 
 5 July – Robert Burchfield, lexicographer (born 1923)
 11 July – Sir Terry McLean, sports journalist and writer (born 1913)
 22 July – Paul Clarkin, polo player (born 1950)
 28 July – Dame Janet Paul, publisher, painter and art historian (born 1919)
 29 July – Maurice Dixon, rugby union player (born 1929)

August 
 14 August
 Eric Petrie, cricketer (born 1927)
 Sir Trevor Skeet, politician (born 1918)
 21 August – Amelia Batistich, writer (born 1915)
 23 August – Trevor Blake, cricketer (born 1937)
 25 August – Roger Broughton, cricketer (born 1958)
 26 August – Bill Marsters, Cook Islands religious leader (born 1923)

September 
 1 September – Sir Alan Stewart, university administrator (born 1917)
 2 September – Alan Preston, association football player and cricketer (born 1932)
 11 September – Ruth Symons, cricketer (born 1913)
 20 September – Pat Hanly, painter (born 1932)
 29 September – David Jackson, boxer (born 1955)

October 
 5 October – Maurice Wilkins, physicist and molecular biologist (born 1916)
 10 October – Maurice Shadbolt, writer and playwright (born 1932)
 23 October – George Silk, photojournalist (born 1916)

November 
 1 November – Barry Brown, boxer (born 1931)
 7 November – Eddie Charlton, snooker and billiards player (born 1929)
 8 November – Frank Houston, religious leader (born 1922)
 12 November – Jim Eyles, archaeologist (born 1926)

December 
 8 December – Noel Mills, rower (born 1944)
 11 December – Arthur Lydiard, athlete, athletics coach (born 1917)
 17 December – Ray Dowker, cricketer and association football player (born 1919)
 29 December – Liddy Holloway, actor and television scriptwriter (born 1947)

See also
List of years in New Zealand
Timeline of New Zealand history
History of New Zealand
Military history of New Zealand
Timeline of the New Zealand environment
Timeline of New Zealand's links with Antarctica

For world events and topics in 2004 not specifically related to New Zealand see: 2004

References

 
New Zealand
New Zealand
Years of the 21st century in New Zealand
2000s in New Zealand